John D. Lynch (September 17, 1947 – July 24, 2018) was an American politician in the state of Montana. He was also a teacher, retiring from that profession in 2002. Lynch served in the Montana House of Representatives from 1971 to 1978 and in the State Senate from 1982 to 1999. From 1991 to 1994, he was President pro tempore of the state Senate.

References

1947 births
2018 deaths
Politicians from Butte, Montana
Montana State University–Northern alumni
University of Montana Western alumni
Educators from Montana
Democratic Party members of the Montana House of Representatives
Democratic Party Montana state senators